Oroscopa is a genus of moths of the family Erebidae. The genus was erected by Herbert Druce in 1891.

Species
Oroscopa belus Schaus, 1914 Panama
Oroscopa calverti Schaus, 1911 Costa Rica
Oroscopa concha H. Druce, 1891 Panama
Oroscopa cordobensis Schaus, 1916 Mexico
Oroscopa diascia Hampson, 1924 Trinidad
Oroscopa electrona Schaus, 1916 Brazil (Rio de Janeiro)
Oroscopa hacupha Schaus, 1911 Costa Rica
Oroscopa microdonta Hampson, 1924 Trinidad
Oroscopa noctifera Schaus, 1912 French Guiana
Oroscopa privigna (Möschler, 1880) Costa Rica, French Guiana, Surinam
Oroscopa punctata H. Druce, 1891 Panama
Oroscopa variegata Hampson, 1926 Peru

References

Calpinae